Cedar Creek Lake may refer to:

Cedar Creek Lake (Kentucky)
Cedar Creek Reservoir (Texas)